was a Japanese right wing and ultranationalist founder of Genyosha (Black Ocean Society) and Kokuryukai (Black Dragon Society). Tōyama was a strong advocate of Pan Asianism (Greater East Asia Co-Prosperity Sphere).

Early life
Tōyama was born to a poor samurai family in Fukuoka City in Kyūshū. In his youth, he fought in the Saga Rebellion of 1874.

In 1881, Tōyama became one of the founders of the Genyosha, a secret society and terrorist organization whose agenda was to agitate for Japanese military expansion and conquest of the Asian continent.  The society attracted disaffected ex-samurai, and also figures involved in organized crime to assist in its campaigns of violence and assassination against foreigners and left-wing politicians. In 1889, Tōyama and the Genyosha were implicated in the attempted assassination of foreign minister Ōkuma Shigenobu.

Covert government cooperation

Tōyama was both a founder and one-time head of the Black Dragon Society.

Immediately prior to the start of the First Sino-Japanese War, Tōyama organized the Tenyukyo, a secret society and paramilitary force that operated in Korea prior to the arrival of the Imperial Japanese Army, making detailed topographic maps, scouting out Chinese and Korean military installations and deployment, and arranging for logistic support. Along with Genyosha operatives in Korea and Manchuria, the Tenyukyo provided interpreters and guides to the regular Japanese army after their invasion.

Tōyama was a strong supporter of Japanese control over Manchuria, and joined forces with the anti-Russian Tairo Doshikai movement in 1903. He also supported the Chinese republican revolutionaries against the Qing dynasty and gave considerable support to Sun Yat-sen. When the Chinese revolution began in 1911, he went to China in person as an advisor and to personally oversee Genyosha activities and to provide assistance to Sun Yat-sen.

Following the Chinese revolution, Tōyama officially retired, and apparently refused to play an active role in the Black Dragon Society (Kokuryu-Kai) that he helped create as a successor to the Genyosha. He remained an influential behind-the-scenes figure in Japanese politics during the following years.

Influence in nationalist Japan
In the 1930s, he was considered as a superpatriot by a large section of the Japanese public, including the military. In 1932, after the assassination of several "liberal" political figures, and following rumors that then Premier Saito and others were to be assassinated in turn, the government had Tōyama's house raided and searched, and his son arrested - leading to a momentary pacification of the situation.

Legacy
 

Although Tōyama remained a private citizen all his life, he was known as the "Shadow Shogun," "Spymaster," and "The Boss of Bosses," because of his tremendous covert influence on the nationalist politics and the yakuza crime syndicates. He also wrote an influential book on the "Three Shu" (Katsu Kaishu, Takahashi Deishu, and Yamaoka Tesshu). Despite his ultranationalism, Tōyama was paradoxically on good terms with Onisaburo Deguchi, Japan's most fervent pacifist. Tōyama was a charismatic, complex, and controversial figure in his lifetime, and remains so to this day.

He died in 1944 at his summer home on Gotemba, Shizuoka Prefecture, at the base of Mount Fuji.

Radio Tokyo announced that funeral services lasting more than three hours were held for him in Tokyo.

See also
 Black Dragon Society

References

Obituary; Oct 6, 1944, The New York Times pg. 23
Joseph C. Grew, Ten years in Japan p 69 ASIN: B0006ER51M

1855 births
1944 deaths
Japanese politicians
People from Fukuoka
Pan-Asianists